Chia (pronounced /kia/), also named Baia di Chia, is a coastal area in southern Sardinia (Italy), which is also a village, frazione of the municipality of Domus de Maria, in the Province of South Sardinia.

References

External links

 Baia di Chia website

Frazioni of the Province of Cagliari